is a private junior college in Niigata, Niigata, Japan, established in 1968.

External links
 Official website 

Educational institutions established in 1968
Private universities and colleges in Japan
Universities and colleges in Niigata Prefecture
Japanese junior colleges
Engineering universities and colleges in Japan